Gallant may refer to:

 Gallant (singer) (born 1991), American singer and songwriter
 Gallant (surname), people with the surname
 Gallant, Alabama, United States
 A gallant, or a man exhibiting courage
 A gallant, a member of the Parliament of the United Kingdom who holds a gallantry award
 Goofus and Gallant, characters in a Highlights for Children magazine cartoon feature

Ships
 HMS Gallant (H59), a G-class destroyer
 USS Gallant (MSO-489), an Aggressive-class minesweeper